Trudi Roth (2 April 1930 – 11 June 2016) was a Swiss stage and film actress who starred in Swiss German language cinema and television and stage productions.

Biography 
Born in Basel, Switzerland, Roth lived in the municipality of Zürich. Her first stage experiences date back to her childhood as she had a small role at the Stadttheater Basel in 1939. She attended the Konservatorium under Ernst Ginsberg in Basel, followed by performances beginning in 1947 with the cabaret-doodle-doo, KiKeriKi with César Keiser and Cabaret Cornichon respectively Cabaret Fédéral. Later she starred in comedies and musicals, and Trudi Roth acted for the radio in radio plays and for the Swiss television.

Roth's most popular role was the character of Martha Aebersold in the Swiss comedy serial Fascht e Familie in the 1990s. Among others, Trudi Roth also starred in about a dozen plays, musicals and farces on Bernhard-Theater Zürich between 1965 and 2001. Trudi Roth motivated film director Marie-Louise Bless to create the television film Das Paar im Kahn in 2004.

Charles Lewinsky, creator of Fascht e Familie, recalls that she played every summer the Chaschperli in Zürich, followed by appearances in films, television series and in the Bernhard Theater. At the age of 80, she still played a role in his play 'Huusfründe'. He remembers the long conversations with Trudi Roth: It was impossible, to talk briefly with Trudi. When I told my wife, now I call on Trudi she said: 'I'll see you in an hour'. Trudi Roth was Charles Lewinsky sympathetic at the first co-operation, above all to have the gift of the gab.

Personal life 
From 1953 to 1957 she lived in Düsseldorf while working for the German Kom(m)ödchen ensemble; Roth then returned to Basel. With her partner Hans Moeckel, conductor of the Swiss Federal entertainment orchestra, she moved to Zürich in the 1970s. Although in a relationship, she remained single and childless.

Death 
In the last years of her life, the actress sometimes did not recognize her brother Alfred, and forgot her former success as an artist. We were very close, "like twins," he said in an interview: She had a quirky sense of humor, was never jealous, spoke directly and lived modestly." As Trudi Roth's family announced to the Swiss television SRF, the actress and cabaret artist died on the night of 11 June 2016 in a nursing home in Zürich. Cause of death was her age of 86, and dementia.

Awards 
 1995: Prix Walo

Filmography (selected works) 
 2004: Flamingo (TV series)
 1994–1997: Fascht e Familie (100 episodes)
 1980: 
 1962: The 42nd Heaven
 1953: Metamorphose

References

External links 
 

1930 births
2016 deaths
Swiss stage actresses
Swiss film actresses
20th-century Swiss actresses
Actors from Basel-Stadt
Swiss musical theatre actresses
Swiss television actresses
Swiss satirists
Swiss parodists
Women satirists